The 2015–16 Danish Superliga season was the 26th season of the Danish Superliga, which decides the Danish football championship. Midtjylland were the defending champions.

As Denmark dropped from nineteenth to twenty-second place in the 2015 UEFA association coefficient rankings at the end of the 2014–15 season, the champion of the league will qualify for the UEFA Champions League; that club will commence its campaign in the second qualifying round. Furthermore, the second and third-place clubs will enter the UEFA Europa League in the first qualifying round.

Only one team will be relegated after the season due to the Superliga being expanded to 14 teams from the beginning of the 2016–17 season.

Teams
FC Vestsjælland and Silkeborg IF finished the 2014–15 season in 11th and 12th place, respectively, and were relegated to the 2015–16 1st Division.

The relegated teams were replaced by 2014–15 1st Division champions Viborg FF and the runners-up AGF.

A new sponsorship agreement for Randers Stadium was presented on 22 September 2015, when the Fårup-based fertilizer company BioNutria acquired the naming rights for the stadium from AutoC, effectively changing the name of the home field of Randers FC from AutoC Park Randers to BioNutria Park Randers. Last in the season, the stadium of FC Nordsjælland changed its official name to Right to Dream Park following a naming rights agreement with the young academy Right to Dream, taking effect on 27 April 2016.

Stadia and locations

Personnel and sponsoring
Note: Flags indicate national team as has been defined under FIFA eligibility rules. Players and Managers may hold more than one non-FIFA nationality.

Managerial changes

League table

Positions by round

Results

Matchday 1–11

Matchday 12–33

Top goalscorers

Updated to games played on May 30, 2016 Source: fifa.com

References

External links
  

Danish Superliga seasons
1
Denmark